Aethiothemis palustris is a species of dragonfly in the family Libellulidae. It is found in Côte d'Ivoire, Ghana, Guinea, Guinea-Bissau, Mali, Nigeria, possibly Ethiopia, and possibly Uganda.

References

Libellulidae
Insects described in 1912
Taxonomy articles created by Polbot